Abdellatif Laâbi is a Moroccan poet, journalist, novelist, playwright, translator and political activist, born in 1942 in Fes, Morocco. 

Laâbi, then teaching French, founded with other poets the artistic journal Souffles, an important literary review in 1966. It was considered as a meeting point of some poets who felt the emergency of a poetic stand and revival, but which, very quickly, crystallized all Moroccan creative energies: painters, film-makers, men of theatre, researchers and thinkers. It was banned in 1972, but throughout its short life, it opened up to cultures from other countries of the Maghreb and those of the Third World.

Abdellatif Laâbi was imprisoned, tortured and sentenced to ten years in prison for "crimes of opinion" (for his political beliefs and his writings) and served a sentence from 1972–1980. He was, in 1985, forced into exile in France. The political beliefs that were judged criminal are reflected in the following comment, for example: "Everything which the Arab reality offers that is generous, open and creative is crushed by regimes whose only anxiety is to perpetuate their own power and self-serving interest. And what is often worse is to see that the West remains insensitive to the daily tragedy while at the same time accommodating, not to say supporting, the ruling classes who strangle the free will and aspirations of their people."

Awards and honors 

 In 1985, Laabi was made Commander of the Ordre des Arts et des Lettres
 In 1999, he won the Fonlon-Nichols Award
 In 2006, he received the Alain Bosquet Prize, for all of his work
 In 2008, Laabi won the Naim Frashëri Prize
 In 2008, he was awarded the Robert Ganzo Prize of Poetry
 In 2009, he received the Prix Goncourt de la Poésie
 In 2011, he won the Benjamin Fondane International Prize for Francophone Literature
 In 2011, he was awarded Academie française’s Grand prix de la francophonie
 In 2015, he won the Prix Ecritures & Spiritualités
 In 2020, he was awarded the Mahmoud Darwish Award for Culture and Creativity
 In 2021, Laabi won the Roger Kowalski Award for Poetry, for his collection, Presque riens

Works
Each year for a first edition links to its corresponding "[year] in poetry" article for poetry or "[year] in literature" article for other works:

Poetry
 1980: Le Règne de barbarie. Seuil, Paris (épuisé)
 1980: Histoire des sept crucifiés de l'espoir. La Table rase, Paris
 1981: Sous le bâillon le poème. L'Harmattan, Paris
 1985: Discours sur la colline arabe. L'Harmattan, Paris
 1986: L'Écorché vif. L'Harmattan, Paris
 1990: Tous les déchirements. Messidor, Paris (épuisé)
 1992: Le soleil se meurt. La Différence, Paris
 1993: L'Étreinte du monde. © La Différence et © Abdellatif Laâbi, Paris
 1996: Le Spleen de Casablanca. La Différence, Paris
 2000: Poèmes périssables, La Différence, coll. Clepsydre, Paris (épuisé)
 2003: L'automne promet, La Différence, coll. Clepsydre, Paris
 2003: Les Fruits du corps, La Différence, coll. Clepsydre, Paris
 2005: Écris la vie, La Différence, coll. Clepsydre, Paris, Prix Alain Bosquet 2006
 2003: Œuvre poétique, La Différence, coll. Œuvre complète, Paris
 2007: Mon cher double, La Différence, coll. Clepsydre, Paris
 2008: Tribulations d'un rêveur attitré, coll. La Clepsydre, La Différence, Paris
 2010: Oeuvre poétique II, La Différence
 2016: Le Principe d'incertitude, La Différence
 2018: L'Espoir à l'arraché, Le Castor astral
 2020: Presque riens, Le Castor astral
 2022: La poésie est invincible, Le Castor astral

Novels
 1969: L'Œil et la Nuit, Casablanca, Atlantes, 1969 ; SMER, Rabat, 1982; La Différence, coll. "Minos", Paris, 2003
 1982: Le Chemin des ordalies. Denoël, Paris; La Différence, coll. "Minos", Paris, 2003
 1989: Les Rides du lion. Messidor, Paris (épuisé); La Différence, coll. "Minos", Paris, 2007

Drama
 1987: Le Baptême chacaliste, L'Harmattan, Paris
 1993: Exercices de tolérance, La Différence, Paris
 1994: Le Juge de l'ombre, La Différence, Paris
 2000: Rimbaud et Shéréazade, La Différence, Paris

Children's books
 1986: Saïda et les voleurs de soleil ; bilingue français-arabe ; images de Charles Barat. Messidor/La Farandole, Paris, (épuisé)
 1995: L'Orange bleue ; illustrations de Laura Rosano. Seuil Jeunesse, Paris

Other works
 1983: Chroniques de la citadelle d'exil ; lettres de prison (1972–1980), Denoël, Paris; La Différence, Paris, 2005.
 1985: La Brûlure des interrogations ; entretiens-essais (réalisés par J. Alessandra). L'Harmattan, Paris
 1997: Un continent humain ; entretiens, textes inédits. Paroles d'aube, Vénissieux
 2005: D'humus et de lave ; poème manuscrit ; gravures de Bouchaïb Maoual ; édition limitée à 12 exemplaires ; Al Manar

Translations from Arabic
 1982: Rires de l'arbre à palabre (poèmes), d'Abdallah Zrika. L'Harmattan, Paris
 1983: Rien qu'une autre année (poèmes), de Mahmoud Darwich. Unesco/Éditions de Minuit, Paris, 1983.
 1986: Soleil en instance (roman), de Hanna Mina. Unesco/Éditions Silex, Paris, 1986.
 1987: Autobiographie du voleur de feu (poèmes), d'Abd al-Wahhab Al-Bayati. Unesco/Actes Sud, Paris, 1987.
 1988: Je t'aime au gré de la mort (poèmes), de Samih al-Qâsim. Unesco/Éditions de Minuit, Paris, 1988.
 1989: Plus rares sont les roses (poèmes), de Mahmoud Darwich. Éditions de Minuit, Paris, 1989.
 1990: La Poésie palestinienne contemporaine (anthologie). Éditions Messidor, Paris, 1990.
 1990: L'Espace du Noûn (poèmes), de Hassan Hamdane. En collaboration avec Leïla Khatib. Éditions Messidor, Paris
 1991: Les Oiseaux du retour. Contes de Palestine, bilingues. En collaboration avec Jocelyne Laâbi. Éditions Messidor/La Farandole, Paris
 1992: La Joie n'est pas mon métier (poèmes), de Mohammed Al-Maghout. Éditions de la Différence, coll. Orphée, Paris
 1997: Retour à Haïfa (nouvelles), de Ghassan Kanafani. En collaboration avec Jocelyne Laâbi. Actes-Sud, Paris

Adaptations (drama) and other publications
 1984: Va ma terre, quelle belle idée. Pièce tirée du Chemin des ordalies, roman. Compagnie des Quatre Chemins, dirigée par Catherine de Seynes. Paris
 1984: Histoire des sept crucifiés de l'espoir. Atelier-théâtre du Septentrion, dirigé par Robert Condamin et Jacqueline Scalabrini. Antibes
 1984: Chroniques de la citadelle d'exil. Théâtre Expression 7, Guy Lavigerie. Limoges, 1984.
 1987: Saïda et les voleurs de soleil. Atelier-théâtre du Septentrion. Antibes, 1987.
 1988: Le Règne de barbarie. Compagnie du Mentir-Vrai, dirigée par Omar Tary. Lille
 1988: Journal du dernier homme. Tiré des Rides du lion, roman. Lecture par Edwine Moatti et Denis Manuel. Paris
 1992: Le Retour de Saïda. Atelier-théâtre du Septentrion. Antibes, 1992.
 1994: Le Soleil se meurt. Théâtre d'Aujourd'hui. Casablanca

Autobiography
 2004: Le fond de la Jarre (translated in Spanish: Fez es un espejo, Madrid, ediciones del oriente y del mediterráneo
 2021: La Fuite vers Samarkand, Le Castor astral

Works available in English
 2003: The World's Embrace: Selected Poems. City Lights, 2003. Translated by V. Reinking, A. George, E. Makward.
 2009: Fragments of a Forgotten Genesis. Leafe Press, 2009. Translated by Gordon & Nancy Hadfield.
 2012: The Rule of Barbarism. Pirogue Poets series, 2012. Translated by André Naffis-Sahely
 2013: The Bottom of the Jar. Archipelago Books, 2013. Translated by André Naffis-Sahely
 2013: Poems. Poetry Translation Centre, 2013. Translated by André Naffis-Sahely
 2016: Selected Poems of Abdellatif Laâbi. Carcanet Press, 2016. Translated by André Naffis-Sahely
 2016: In Praise of Defeat. Archipelago Books, 2016. Translated by Donald Nicholson-Smith (shortlisted for the 2017 Griffin Poetry Prize)
 2021: The Uncertainty Principle''. Lithic Press, 2021. Translated by Annie Jamison

Footnotes

  Jeune Afrique magazine, September 5, 1990, cited by Adel Darwish and Gregory Alexander in "Unholy Babylon, The Secret History of Saddam's War" (Victor Gollenz Ltd London 1991): p. 71

Further reading
 The World's Embrace consists of poems selected by Laabi from three books published in French over the past ten years: Le Soleil se meurt (The Sun Is Dying), L'Etreinte du monde (The World's Embrace), and Le Spleen de Casablanca (The Spleen of Casablanca).

External links
  Pierre Joris on Laabi winning the Prix Goncourt
 Interview (English) with Laabi
 Abdellatif Laabi's website. This website contains links to all issues of artistic journal Anfas/Souffles.
 "Interview (Spanish) with Laabi and poem Pueblo de Madrid, perdón", ediciones del oriente y del mediterraneo

1942 births
French-language poets
Living people
Moroccan autobiographers
Moroccan dramatists and playwrights
Moroccan male writers
Male dramatists and playwrights
20th-century Moroccan poets
Prix Goncourt de la Poésie winners
People from Fez, Morocco
Moroccan torture victims
Moroccan translators
21st-century Moroccan poets
Moroccan male poets
Commandeurs of the Ordre des Arts et des Lettres